The Wipers Times is a play by Ian Hislop and Nick Newman, based on their 2013 BBC dramatization of the creation of The Wipers Times newspaper during World War I.

Productions 
The play premiered at the Watermill Theatre, Newbury from 22 September to 29 October 2016.

Following its run at the Watermill, the play toured to the Lyceum Theatre, Sheffield, New Wolsey Theatre, Ipswich and Salisbury Playhouse during November 2016.

The play transferred to the Arts Theatre in London's West End from 21 March to 13 May 2017. From September to November 2017 began another tour at the New Theatre, Cardiff, Oxford Playhouse, Palace Theatre, Westcliff-on-Sea, Yvonne Arnaud Theatre, Guildford, Manchester Opera House, Theatre Royal, Glasgow and Everyman Theatre, Cheltenham.

From August to October 2018, the play will embark an 11-week UK tour beginning at Nottingham Theatre Royal before touring to Oxford Playhouse, Northcott Theatre, Exeter, Festival Theatre, Malvern, Curve, Leicester, Devonshire Park Theatre, Eastbourne and Birmingham Repertory Theatre. Following the tour, the play will return to the Arts Theatre in London's West End running from 16 October to 1 December 2018.

References

External links 

 Official website

2016 plays
British plays
Plays about World War I
West End plays
Plays based on actual events